Phaeochoropsis mucosa is a plant pathogen infecting coconuts.

References

External links 
 Index Fungorum
 USDA ARS Fungal Database

Fungal plant pathogens and diseases
Coconut palm diseases
Phyllachorales
Fungi described in 1999